The Cultural Alliance of Greater Washington (CAGW) works to increase appreciation, support, and resources for arts and culture in the Greater Washington, D.C. region with over 300 member organizations.

References 

Non-profit organizations based in Washington, D.C.
 
Arts organizations based in Washington, D.C.